16β-Hydroxyestrone (16β-OH-E1) is an endogenous estrogen which serves as a metabolite of estrone as well as a metabolic intermediate in the transformation of estrone into epiestriol (16β-hydroxyestradiol). 16β-Hydroxyestrone has similar estrogenic activity to that of 16α-hydroxyestrone. It is less potent than estradiol or estrone but can produce similar maximal uterotrophy at sufficiently high doses, suggesting a fully estrogenic profile.

See also
 16-Ketoestrone

References

Estranes
Estrogens
Human metabolites
Phenols